Pareuxoa koehleri is a moth of the family Noctuidae. It is found in Punta Arenas, Termas de Río Blanco and Cautín in Chile.

The wingspan is about 30 mm. Adults are on wing in February.

External links
 Noctuinae of Chile

Noctuinae
Endemic fauna of Chile